Rees-Mogg may refer to:
 Anne Rees-Mogg, film director and teacher
 Annunziata Rees-Mogg (born 1979), British Brexit Party politician and MEP
 Jacob Rees-Mogg (born 1969), British Conservative politician and MP
 William Rees-Mogg (1928–2012), British journalist and life peer; father of Jacob and Annunziata

Compound surnames
English-language surnames